AXR may refer to:
 Abdominal x-ray
 Amrep Corporation, traded as AXR
 The TPD USA AXR, a clone of the Steyr AUG assault rifle